Thai Americans (formerly referred to as Siamese Americans) are Americans of Thai ancestry. The Thai American population is racially and ethnically diverse, consisting of many Thais who identify as mixed race and as Thai Chinese.

History in the US
The 1930 Census recorded just 18 ‘Siamese’ Americans. According to the MPI Data Hub, there have been a total of 253,585 Thai people who have immigrated to the United States as of 2016.  That year, they were 0.0057% of all immigrants. In comparing data from the MPI Data Hub to the U.S. Census Bureau, there are significant inconsistencies of total current population. According to the U.S. Census, there are currently 300,319 Thai people living in the United States today, with an error margin of +/- 14,326.

Thai immigration to the United States proceeded very slowly. It began in earnest during and after the Vietnam War, in which Thailand was an ally of the US and South Vietnam. Records show that in the decade between 1960 and 1970, some 5,000 Thais immigrated to the United States. In the following decade, the number increased to 44,000. From 1981 to 1990, approximately 64,400 Thai citizens moved to the United States.

The general trend of Thai immigration can be stated at a relatively steady rising pace save for the peak in 2006, which marks the dissolution of the Thai Parliament in February and a subsequent coup in the following September. From 2007 to 2008, numbers dip back down to regular rate until 2009, which proceeded a year of military and political turmoil due to the disconnect between the monarchic Royal Army and the relatively newly established democratic government in 2006.

According to the 2000 census there were 150,093 Thais in the United States.

In 2009, 304,160 US residents listed themselves as Thais.

Demographics
Los Angeles, California, has the largest Thai population outside of Asia. It is home to the world's first Thai Town. In 2002, it was estimated that over 80,000 Thais and Thai Americans live in Los Angeles. Other large or sizeable Thai communities are in Clark County, Nevada; Cook County, Illinois; Tarrant County, Texas; Orange County, California; San Bernardino County, California; San Diego County, California; San Francisco, California; Fresno, California; Sacramento, California; King County, Washington; Fairfax County, Virginia; Philadelphia, Pennsylvania; Albuquerque, NM; Queens, New York; Madison, Wisconsin; Seattle, Washington; and Montgomery County, Maryland. The 2010 U.S. census counted 237,629 Thai Americans in the country, of whom 67,707 live in California.

Statistics
 Data from Migration Policy Institute
 Data from Pew Research Center 
Thai-born population:

New legal permanent residents:

Thais who acquire US citizenship:

Cultural influence on America
Thai Americans are famous for bringing Thai cooking to the United States. Thai cuisine is popular across the country. Even non-Thai restaurants may include Thai-influenced dishes on their menu like Pad Thai and Thai tea.

Thai culture's prominence in the United States is disproportionate to their numbers. The stationing of American troops in Thailand during the Vietnam War exposed the GIs to Thai culture and cuisine, and many of them came home with Thai wives.

Political involvement
In 2003, two Thai Americans ran in municipal elections, one in Anaheim, California, the other in Houston, Texas. Both lost.
However, on November 7, 2006, Gorpat Henry Charoen became the first US official of Thai origin, when he was elected to the La Palma City Council in California. On December 18, 2007, he became the first Thai American mayor of a US city.

In 2010, Charles Djou became the first Thai-American elected to Congress; he had previously served in the Hawaii State House and Honolulu City Council.

Tammy Duckworth, a Thai American Iraq War veteran, ran for Congress as a Democrat in Illinois's 6th district in the 2006 mid-term election. She was narrowly defeated, and served for two years as Assistant Secretary of Public and Intergovernmental Affairs for the United States Department of Veterans Affairs. She was previously the director of the Illinois Department of Veterans Affairs. She was considered a likely nominee for appointment to the United States Senate to fill the vacancy caused by Barack Obama's election to the Presidency of the United States; however, Roland Burris was appointed instead. On November 6, 2012 Duckworth was elected to the US Congress to represent the 8th District of Illinois. On November 8, 2016, she was elected as the junior Senator from Illinois, the seat previously held by Barack Obama.

Bhumibol Adulyadej, the previous King and Head of the State of Thailand, was born at the Mount Auburn Hospital in Cambridge, Massachusetts, on December 5, 1927. At the time, his father was studying at Harvard University. He is the only American-born monarch in history.

In 2017, Ekamon "Ek" Venin was appointed and later elected to the Borough Council in Pompton Lakes, New Jersey. In 2020, he served as Council President and was re-elected to another 3-year term.

Notable Thai Buddhist temples
 Abhayagiri Buddhist Monastery, Redwood Valley, California
 San Fran Dhammaram Temple, San Francisco
 Vajiradhammapadip Temple, Centereach and Mount Vernon in New York
 Wat Boston Buddha Vararam, Bedford, Massachusetts
 Wat Buddhananachat of Austin, Del Valle, Texas
 Wat Buddhasamakeevanaram, Bossier City, Louisiana
 Wat Buddhanusorn, Fremont, California
 Wat Carolina Buddhajakra Vanaram, Bolivia, North Carolina
 Wat Florida Dhammaram, Kissimmee, Florida
 Wat Mettāvarānaṁ, Valley Center, California
 Wat Mongkolratanaram, Berkeley, California
 Wat Mongkolratanaram, Tampa, Florida
 Wat Nawamintararachutis, Raynham, Massachusetts
 Wat Pasantidhamma, Carrollton, Virginia

Notable people

 Pornthip Nakhirunkanok Simon, Miss Universe 1988
 Allison Sansom, Miss Universe Thailand 2014
 Anthony Ampaipitakwong, professional soccer player
 Todd Angkasuwan, music video and documentary film director
 Chang and Eng Bunker, Siamese twins
 Anthony Burch, writer of video game Borderlands 2
 Amanda Mildred Carr, BMX racer
 Lisa Changadveja, political strategist and author
 Michael Chaturantabut, actor and martial artist
 Cherry Chevapravatdumrong, producer and story editor on Family Guy
 Johnny Damon, MLB player
 Charles Djou, politician
 Tammy Duckworth, politician and military officer
 Myra Molloy, singer and actress
 Lada Engchawadechasilp, beauty pageant queen
 Kevin Kaesviharn, football player
 Sanit Khewhok, artist
 Eric Koston, professional skater
 Lynn Kriengkrairut, ice dancer
 Nicolene Limsnukan, Miss Thailand World 2018
 Nichkhun, singer
 Thakoon Panichgul, fashion designer
 Utt Panichkul, actor, model and VJ
 Ben Parr, author
 John Pippy, politician
 Stacy Prammanasudh, golfer
 Jocelyn Seagrave, television actress
 Alex Sink, former Chief Financial Officer for the state of Florida
 Prim Siripipat, sportscaster
 Brenda Song, actress
 Ashly Burch, actress
 Tamarine Tanasugarn, professional tennis player
 Kevin Tancharoen, dancer, choreographer, television producer and film director
 Maurissa Tancharoen, actress, singer, dancer, television producer/writer and lyricist
 Chrissy Tiegen, model, TV host, food blogger
 Traphik or Timothy DeLaGhetto, rapper, comedian, and videographer on YouTube
 David Wagner (soccer), United States men's national soccer team striker of Thai descent. 
 Tiger Woods, professional golfer
 Tata Young, singer, actress and former model who lives in Bangkok
 Janie Tienphosuwan, actress
 Prince Gomolvilas, playwright	
 Pop Mhan, comic book writer	
 Dan Santat, author and winner of the 2015 Caldecott Medal.	
 Jet Tila, celebrity chef and restaurateur
 Matt Braly, creator of Amphibia
 Vicha Ratanapakdee, Thai-American man who was murdered in San Francisco

Thai Americans in popular culture
 Anne Boonchuy and her parents from the animated TV series Amphibia are Thai-Americans.
 Molly McGee, Darryl McGee and their mother Sharon McGee from the animated TV series The Ghost and Molly McGee are Thai-Americans.
 Stonecutter (Utama Somchart) and Avenger X (Cressida) from Marvel Comics are Thai-Americans.

See also

Thai Canadians
Thais in the United Kingdom
Thai Town, Los Angeles
Thailand–United States relations

Sources
We the People Asians in the United States Census 2000 Special Reports
Vong, Pueng. Unrest in the Homeland Awakens the Thai Community IMDiversity March 29, 2006
Asian American Action Fund 2006 endorsed candidates

References

Further reading
 Ratner, Megan. "Thai Americans." Gale Encyclopedia of Multicultural America, edited by Thomas Riggs, (3rd ed., vol. 4, Gale, 2014), pp. 357–368. Online

External links
ThaiNewYork.com
Thaitown USA News
Asian Pacific Newspaper
Siam Media Newspaper
Sereechai Newspaper
 Yearning to be Free: US Immigration and Thai Sex Workers, Thailand Law Forum, June 30, 2010

Asian-American society
Southeast Asian American
 
 
Thai diaspora in North America